The Rabbinical Council of Victoria is a body representing the state's Orthodox rabbis. It was established in 1967. Its primary goals are to provide proffesional development to its member rabbis, to enhance community participation among members of the Jewish community and to foster positive relations with leaders of other communities. They also have an oversight role of the Melbourne Beth Din.

Notable members 
 Chaim Gutnick - founder of the council, and president until his death in 2003
 Yaakov Glasman
 Yitzchok Dovid Groner
 Mordechai Gutnick
 Sholem Gutnick
 Joseph Gutnick

References 

Orthodox Judaism
Jewish organisations based in Australia